This is a list of German language place names (toponyms) for the region of Upper Silesia. Upper Silesia today is in the Opole Voivodeship and the Silesian Voivodeship in Poland.

Biała - Zülz
Bielsko (nowadays part of Bielsko-Biała) - Bielitz
Bytom - Beuthen
Chorzów - Königshütte
Cieszyn - Teschen
Gliwice - Gleiwitz
Głogówek - Oberglogau
Głubczyce - Leobschütz
Głuchołazy - Bad Ziegenhals
Katowice - Kattowitz
Kędzierzyn-Koźle - Kandrzin-Cosel
Kluczbork - Kreuzburg
Krapkowice - Krappitz
Łaziska Górne - Ober Lazisk
Mikołów - Nicolai
Mysłowice - Myslowitz
Nysa - Neisse
Olesno - Rosenberg
Opole - Oppeln
Orzesze - Orzesche
Piekary Śląskie - Deutsch Piekar
Prudnik - Neustadt
Pszczyna - Pless
Racibórz Ratibor
Ruda Śląska - Ruda
Siemianowice Śląskie - Laurahütte
Strzelce Opolskie - Groß Strehlitz
Świętochłowice - Schwientochlowitz
Tarnowskie Góry - Tarnowitz
Tychy - Tichau
Zabrze - Hindenburg
Zdzieszowice - Deschowitz
Żory - Sohrau

See also 
List of German exonyms for places in Poland

 G
Silesia Upper